Sun Dance is the first part of the fifth studio album Sun Dance & Penny Rain released by Aimer. It was released on April 10, 2019 in a regular CD only edition and with Penny Rain in three versions: a limited 2 CD + 2 BD + Special Storage Box + Sun Dance Jigsaw Puzzle, a limited 2 CD + BD edition (Type-A), and a limited 2CD + DVD edition (Type-B). Sun Dance and Penny Rain were Aimer's first new studio albums since daydream in 2016. In addition, Sun Dance is Aimer's first album to be solely produced by agehasprings since her 2012 debut album Sleepless Nights.

Sun Dance peaked at #3 behind Penny Rain on Oricon's Weekly Album Chart on April 22, 2019 and charted for 26 weeks.

Production 
In February 2018, Aimer thought about a concept for her next album after releasing her single "Ref:rain". She then came up with the concept of "Sun and Rain" and used it for her "soleil et pluie" Hall Tour from October 2018 to January 2019. The development of Sun Dance began with the song "3min", which was first performed live on Aimer's Fan Club Tour in August 2018. In addition, after first performing "ONE" live at her Nippon Budokan show in 2017, she desired to record a more upbeat album in contrast to her darker themed releases.

Track listing 
All lyrics by aimerrhytm. All music by Masahiro Tobinai except where indicated. All songs arranged by Kenji Tamai and Masahiro Tobinai except where indicated.

Credits 
Adapted from Booklet.

Production 
Kenji Tamai - producer (agehasprings)
Hideki Morioka – director, organizer (agehasprings)
Kentaro Kondo – director, organizer (agehasprings)
Yuji Chinone - mastering engineer (Sony Music Studios Tokyo)

Album Staff 
Arata Kato – photograph
Manabu Tsujino – executive producer (Sony Music Labels)
Yoshichika Matsumoto - executive producer (SME Records)
Kenji Tamai - executive producer (agehasprings)
Go Matsuda – art direction & design (quia)
Hiroaki Sano – supervise (Sony Music Entertainment)
Megumi Miyai – products coordination (Sony Music Solutions)
Kazuyo Takeuchi - products coordination (Sony Music Solutions)
Ryota Torisu – artist management (aspr)
Mami Fujino – artist management (aspr)
Moe Hattori - assistant artist management (aspr)
Toru Takeuchi - A&R in chief (SME Records)
Mio Uchimura - A&R (SME Records)
Minaho Takahashi – hair & makeup
Tsuyoshi Takahashi – styling

Charts

Album
Weekly charts

Year-end charts

Singles

References

External links
  (Japanese)
 Sun Dance Aimer on agehasprings
 Sun Dance Aimer on quia
 
  
 Sun Dance / Aimer  on VGMdb

Aimer albums
2019 albums
Japanese-language albums
SME Records albums

ja:Sun Dance & Penny Rain